
Gmina Nowe Miasto is a rural gmina (administrative district) in Płońsk County, Masovian Voivodeship, in east-central Poland. Its seat is the village of Nowe Miasto, which lies approximately 17 kilometres (10 mi) north-east of Płońsk and 54 km (33 mi) north-west of Warsaw.

Villages
Gmina Nowe Miasto contains the villages and settlements of Adamowo, Aleksandria, Anielin, Belin, Czarnoty, Gawłówek, Gawłowo, Gościmin Wielki, Grabie, Gucin, Henrykowo, Janopole, Jurzyn, Jurzynek, Kadłubówka, Karolinowo, Kubice, Latonice, Miszewo B, Miszewo Wielkie, Modzele-Bartłomieje, Nowe Miasto, Nowe Miasto-Folwark, Nowosiółki, Popielżyn Dolny, Przepitki, Rostki, Salomonka, Szczawin, Tomaszewo, Władysławowo, Wólka Szczawińska, Zakobiel, Zasonie, Zawady B, Zawady Stare and Żołędowo.

Neighbouring gminas
Gmina Nowe Miasto is bordered by the gminas of Joniec, Nasielsk, Sochocin, Sońsk and Świercze.

References

Polish official population figures 2006

Nowe Miasto
Płońsk County